Tayibe, also spelled Taibeh or Tayiba, is an Arab city in central Israel,  north east of Kfar Saba. Its citizens are Arab-Muslims.

History
A village called Tayyibat al-Ism was on the list of lands allocated by sultan Baibars to his amirs in 663 AH (1265–1266 CE), about five centuries after the Arab conquest of Palestine. In Mamluk times, the village name appeared on documents referring to the waqf of the mosque in Hebron. It has been suggested that the village is identical with Tivata, a settlement mentioned in the Talmud.

Ottoman era
Under Ottoman rule after 1517,   a sijill (royal order) from  941/1535 gave 1/3 of the revenue from Tayyibat al-Ism  to Ribat al-Mansuri (Com.); a hospital in Jerusalem started by Al-Mansur Qalawun in 1282. The tax register of 1596 shows the village was under the administration of the nahiya of Bani Sab. With a population of 50 households ("khana") and 5 bachelors, all Muslim, who paid a fixed tax rate of 33,3% on various agricultural products, including wheat, barley, summer crops (including gura, melons, beans, vegetables etc.), olive trees,  beehives and goats; a total of 19,800 akçe. All of the revenue went to a waqf. Pierre Jacotin called  the village Taibeh on his map in 1799.

The French explorer Victor Guérin  described it as a village south of Fardisya, while in the 1882 "Survey of Western Palestine", Tayibe was described as: "a large straggling village on the end of a slope, principally built of stone. It is supplied by cisterns and surrounded with olives."

British Mandate era
In the  1922 census of Palestine, ‘’Taibeh’’ had a population of 2,350, all Muslims, increasing in the 1931 census, to 2,944, all Muslim, living in 658 houses. The count may have included two nearby Bedouin tribes.

In the 1945 statistics  the population was 4,290 Muslims, while the  land area was 32,750 dunams, according to an official land and population survey. This included some nearby Arab communities. Of this, 559  were allocated for citrus and bananas, 3,180 plantations and irrigable land, 23,460 for cereals, while 281 dunams were classified as built-up areas.

State of Israel
During the 1948 Arab–Israeli War, Israeli forces captured the town lands, but not the town itself. Tayibe was transferred to Israel as part of the 1949 cease-fire agreement with Jordan. According to David Gilmour, "the inhabitants were furious that Abdullah I of Jordan had simply handed them over to Israel but were relieved that they were to be reunited with their land. However, the Law of Acquisition of Absentee Property, which was passed in 1950 but made retroactive, was specially devised to take care of cases like this. Although they had not moved from their village, the inhabitants were declared 'absentees' and their land 'abandoned property'.  According to the villagers, they lost  of their ." 

The families involved were refused access to the maps on which the ruling was based on "national security" grounds. Haaretz described the move as "legalized theft", "in defiance of both the spirit of the law and its rationale".

Tayibe achieved local council status in 1952. In 1990, it was declared a city.

Demographics

According to CBS, in 2001 the ethnic makeup of the city was 100.0% Arab (99.7% Muslim), with no significant Jewish population. In 2001 there were 15,100 males and 14,500 females. 47.5% of the population was 19 years of age or younger, 17.4% between 20 and 29, 20.3% between 30 and 44, 9.6% from 45 to 59, 2.0% from 60 to 64, and 3.3% 65 years of age or older. The population growth rate in 2001 was 3.2%. In 2011, it had a population of 38,575.

Tayibe had an estimated population of 40,200 in 2014, up from 35,700 in the 2008 census.

The population of Tayibe, one of the largest and most developed Arab localities in Israel, is made up of 20 extended families, all Muslim.

Landmarks

An ancient oak tree in Tayibe was declared the largest in Israel. The oak has a trunk circumference of 690 centimeters. According to local legend, there is an angel that watches over the tree and avenges any damage to it. It is said to be 1,400 years old, although this has not been scientifically proven.

Education and culture
In 2001, there were 13 schools with a total enrollment of 6,970 students: 9 elementary schools (3,984 students) and 4 high schools (2,986 students). Nearly half of all 12th graders completed their Bagrut matriculation exams.

An educational empowerment project has been operating in Tayibe since 2006 to reduce the dropout rate among Bedouin students. The students receive extra help in Arabic, Hebrew, English and math, and attend special enrichment workshops in inter-personal communication. Following the success of this project, the project has been expanded to nearby Qalansawe and other Arab villages in Israel.

The Tayibe Women Against Violence organization was established to work against violence in the community. The organization offers seminars and workshops that increase women's awareness of their rights and helps them find jobs.

Sports
The now-defunct Hapoel Tayibe F.C. were the first Israeli Arab club to play in the top division of Israeli football.

Notable people
Senan Abdelqader, architect and urban planner
Hussniya Jabara, member of the Knesset, Meretz
Abdallah Jaber (born 1993), footballer for Israeli Premier League club Hapoel Hadera
Kais Nashef, actor
Mahmud A-Nashaf (1906–1979), member of the Knesset 
Ahmad Tibi, member of the Knesset, Ta'al
Abdul Latif Tibawi (1910–1981), historian and educationalist
Rafik Haj Yahia (1949–2000), member of the Knesset
Walid Haj Yahia, member of the Knesset, Meretz

See also
Demographics of Israel
Arab localities in Israel

References

Bibliography

  
  
Gilmour, David (1983):  Dispossessed. The Ordeal of the Palestinians. Sphere books, Great Britain,

External links
Official website 
Welcome To Tayyiba
Survey of Western Palestine, Map 11:  IAA, Wikimedia commons

Cities in Israel
Arab localities in Israel
Triangle (Israel)
Cities in Central District (Israel)